William Mangion (born 24 August 1958 in Naxxar) is a Maltese singer, best known for presenting Malta in the Eurovision Song Contest 1993 and placing 8th out of 25 countries with This Time.  He is one of Malta's leading vocalist musician.  Mangion took part in the semi-final of the Malta Song for Europe 2007 for Eurovision with the song Forerver Mine, but failed to qualify for the final.

In early 2011, William immigrated to the US , but still makes frequent visits back to Malta. He is a popular singer at weddings in Malta.

References

External links 
William Mangion (official website)

1958 births
Living people
20th-century Maltese male singers
20th-century Maltese singers
Eurovision Song Contest entrants for Malta
Eurovision Song Contest entrants of 1993
21st-century Maltese male singers
21st-century Maltese singers